Gustavo Lanusse (5 January 1909 – 14 March 1938) was an Argentine rower. He competed in the men's eight event at the 1928 Summer Olympics.

References

External links
 

1909 births
1938 deaths
Argentine male rowers
Olympic rowers of Argentina
Rowers at the 1928 Summer Olympics
Rowers from Buenos Aires